The Samsung Hauzen Cup was an annual football competition in South Korean football, and the Korean League Cup held by the K League Federation from 2004 to 2008. This competition was created to allow domestic football while the activity of the South Korean national team was increased.

Finals

Awards

Top goalscorer

Source:

Top assist provider

Source:

See also
 Korean League Cup
 Adidas Cup
 Korean League Cup (Supplementary Cup)

References

External links
Official website 
ROKfootball.com 

 
Korean League Cup
Samsung Sports